Afton Run is a  long 1st order tributary to Coddle Creek in Cabarrus County, North Carolina.  This is the only stream of this name in the United States.

Variant names
According to the Geographic Names Information System, it has also been known historically as:
Ashton Branch
Astin's Branch

Course
Afton Run rises about 2 miles west of Kannapolis, North Carolina and then flows south to join Coddle Creek about 3 miles west of Concord.

Watershed
Afton Run drains  of area, receives about 46.9 in/year of precipitation, has a wetness index of 411.40, and is about 32% forested.

References

Rivers of North Carolina
Rivers of Cabarrus County, North Carolina